A trailer connector is a multi-pole electrical connector between a towing vehicle such as a car or truck and a trailer. It is intended primarily to supply automotive lighting on the trailer, but also provide management and supply to other consumers. It is also referred to as "trailer wire," "trailer cable," or "trailer connecting cable." Another feature the connector offers is feedback from the trailer to the towing vehicle, from being as simple as a fault indication for ABS brakes to advanced command, monitor and control using CAN bus for EBS brakes.

Different occurring variants and their recommended wiring are described here.

Note that the wire cross-section in mm² and AWG listed is the minimum recommended area.

 For ISO connectors the primary unit is in mm² and AWG has been obtained from a conversion table.
 For North American connectors primary unit is AWG and mm² has been obtained from a conversion table. 
In both cases the figures have been rounded up for cable area.

The pictures shown of connectors is pin placement from the outside of the towing vehicle (pin placement under protection lid, if such lid is present).

This is a summary of the primary varieties of trailer connectors.

Standardized variants 

A number of ISO standards apply to trailer connectors.

Regional variants 
Variants that are standardized in a particular region or at the national level and local de facto standards:
 Trailer connectors in Europe
 Trailer connectors in North America
 Trailer connectors in Australia

Special variants 
Variants that are of interest but aren't specific to a region or by a civilian standardization organization.
 Trailer connectors in military organizations

References

External links
 Trailer Connectors and Wiring Diagrams

Automotive electrics
Lighting
DC power connectors